Amir Houshang Ostovar (Persian: هوشنگ استوار) (also transcribed as Hoochang Ostovar, January 30, 1927 – January 7, 2016) was a Persian symphonic music composer and Instructor.

Biography 
Houshang Ostovar was born in Tehran 1927. Inspired by his father Hossein Ostovar (1896–1986) who was one of the first Persian-style pianists.

He studied basic composition with Parviz Mahmoud and finished his music studies at the Royal Conservatory of Brussels with first rank, also spend 2 years in Geneva conservatory to learn more about Piano and Clarinet

Came back to Iran 1952, for many years Ostovar was a professor at the Tehran Conservatory of Music.  Mostly performed by the Tehran Symphony Orchestra his works inspired from Persian folk and classical music in a modern form.  He is also known as a developer of different genres of western music such as Jazz in Iran. 

A few years after the 1979 Revolution Ostovar moved to France.  In 2001 he returned to Tehran and continued his activities as a professor of composition.  He has taught many notable musicians like Ali Tajvidi and Mahyar Dean from Angband.

Works 
The only released work of Ostovar is Suite Iranienne (Persian Suite) which was performed in 1980 by Nuremberg Symphony Orchestra, conducted by Ali Rahbari in the LP Symphonische Dichtungen aus Persien (Symphonic Poems from Persia).

See also 
 Music of Iran
 List of Iranian musicians

References 

Iranian composers
2016 deaths
1927 births